Leonardo Daniel (born 26 July 1954) is a Mexican actor and director. His real name is Leonardo Daniel López de Rodas García.

Family 
His parents were Lorenzo de Rodas and María Idalia.

Filmography

References

External links
 

Living people
1954 births
20th-century Mexican male actors
21st-century Mexican male actors
Mexican male film actors
Mexican male telenovela actors
Male actors from Mexico City
Mexican people of Spanish descent